Seaborne may refer to:

Companies
 Seaborne Airlines, a small airline in Puerto Rico
 Seaborne Freight, short-lived British ferry company

People
 Danny Seaborne (born 1987), English footballer
 Pam Seaborne (1935–2021), British hurdler
 Seaborne Davies (1904–1984), Welsh law teacher and academic, member of parliament

See also
 Seaborn, a surname and given name 
 Seabourn (disambiguation)
 Seabourne, a surname
 Seaburn, a seaside resort in England